Man on the Run is a 1949 British film noir directed by Lawrence Huntington and starring Derek Farr, Joan Hopkins, Edward Chapman, Kenneth More and Laurence Harvey.

Plot
An army deserter, still a fugitive in post-war Britain, wanders into a pawn shop robbery and finds himself mistakenly wanted for murder. Forced to go on the run while attempting to prove his innocence, he meets a war widow who helps him elude the police while he looks for the real criminals.

Cast

 Derek Farr as Sergeant Peter Burden, alias Brown
 Joan Hopkins as Jean Adams
 Edward Chapman as Chief Inspector Mitchell
 Laurence Harvey as Detective Sergeant Lawson
 Howard Marion-Crawford as 1st Paratrooper
 Alfie Bass as Bert the Barge Mate
 John Bailey as Dan Underwood, burglar
 John Stuart as Detective Inspector Jim McBane
 Edward Underdown as Slim Elfey, Burglar Missing Fingers
 Leslie Perrins as Charlie the Fence
 Kenneth More as Corporal Newman the Blackmailer
 Martin Miller as Tony, Cafe Proprietor
 Cameron Hall as Reg Hawkins
 Eleanor Summerfield as May Baker, Anchor Hotel
 Anthony Nicholls as Station Inspector (Wapping)
 Valentine Dyall as Army Judge Advocate

References

External links
 

1949 films
Films shot at Associated British Studios
British drama films
1949 drama films
Films directed by Lawrence Huntington
Films set in London
Films set in Sussex
British black-and-white films
1950s English-language films
1940s English-language films
1940s British films
1950s British films